The French Detective is a 1975 French film directed by Pierre Granier-Deferre, and scripted by Francis Veber from the 1974 novel Adieu poulet ! by Raf Vallet. It received two César nominations for best supporting actor, and another for best editing.

Plot 
Despite the English title, in truth there are two French detectives, based in Rouen. Verjeat is an aging, been-around gumshoe, while Lefevre is his young, callow and cynical associate. The two detectives don't like each other much at first, but this will change. Their current assignment is getting the goods on a corrupt politician. During an election, there is a fight between the supporters of two of the candidates. In the melee political thugs murder an opponent's volunteer and also kill a cop. The officer has time to warn his colleagues that the killer is Portor, a well known thug whose brother is campaigning on behalf of law and order candidate Lardatte. Chief inspector Verjeat believes the politician who hired the thugs is as guilty as the murderous goon. His pursuit of Portor is hampered by Lardatte, for whom he has a personal dislike and misses no opportunity to humiliate. Verjeat's pursuit of Lardatte gets him a warning from his superiors. When he embarrasses Lardatte while disarming a hostage (the dead volunteer's father), Verjeat is told he's being promoted and transferred within a week to a posting outside of Rouen. This will take him off the case. As a result, he then finds himself with a very short time to capture Portor. Verjeat is sure that his upcoming transfer is courtesy of Lardatte and his police contacts. He speeds up his hunt for the goon and, with Lefevre, he engineers a complicated scheme to buy more time before the transfer.

Cast
Lino Ventura as Verjeat
Patrick Dewaere as Lefevre
Victor Lanoux as Pierre Lardatte
Claude Rich as Judge Delmesse
Pierre Tornade as Pignol
Claude Brosset as Portor
Jean Collomb as the barman
Dominique Zardi as a patient
Henri Attal as a gangster
Valérie Mairesse as The rosettes girl

References

External links

1975 films
Films directed by Pierre Granier-Deferre
1970s crime thriller films
1970s comedy thriller films
French crime thriller films
French comedy thriller films
Police detective films
Films scored by Philippe Sarde
1975 comedy films
1970s French-language films
1970s French films
Films with screenplays by Francis Veber